Ayodele Odubela is a Data Scientist at SambaSafety in Denver, Colorado. Prior to entering the data science industry, Odubela worked in social media marketing for a travel agency company. Outside of her work, Odubela is a hockey fan.

Education 
Odubela obtained her Bachelor's degree from the University of Pittsburgh in 2014, majoring in Digital Marketing and Communication. After leaving her digital marketing career, Odubela went back to school and graduated from Regis University (Denver, Colorado) with a Master's degree in Data Science.

Work 
Odubela has worked at a variety of companies, including YooLotto, Adistry, Astral, and Mindbody Inc. Currently, she works for SambaSafety, using machine learning models to mitigate driver risk.

Activism 
Odubela strives to improve the lives of marginalized people through technology. She is the Founder and CEO of FullyConnected, a platform used to promote inclusion of Black professionals in ML/AI.  Odubela spoke on VentureBeat's AI-focused Transform 2020 event with a panel of AI professionals in July, 2020. She expressed concern about biased algorithms excluding marginalized individuals.

Other notable works 
Odubela is currently writing a book called Uncovering the Bias in Machine Learning. In the book, she discusses the underlying biases in machine learning models against underrepresented individuals; she also emphasizes developers responsibility in changing the biased models. In addition to her book, Odubela has written blogs and talked on podcasts about her experience of becoming a data scientist and how underprivileged individuals can enter the data science field.

References 

Living people
University of Pittsburgh alumni
Regis University alumni
Data scientists
Women data scientists
Year of birth missing (living people)